Sir Mark John Boleat (born January 1949, in Jersey) is leader of the Jersey Alliance political party, and deputy chairman of the City of London Corporation's Policy and Resources Committee. He has previously been director general of the Building Societies Association, the Council of Mortgage Lenders and the Association of British Insurers. He is a Common Councilman for Cordwainer Ward and trustee of Centre for London.

He was knighted in the 2017 Birthday Honours.

Boleat was appointed Chairman of the LINK Scheme Ltd, the company that runs the UK ATM network in early 2017.

Boleat joined the board of Arron Banks's Eldon Insurance Service Ltd on 12 June 2019. 

In the 2022 Jersey election, Boleat ran in the St Clement electoral district and was Jersey Alliance's candidate for the role of Chief Minister. Boleat polled last place out of 7 candidates in the district he stood in, receiving 721 votes, and was unelected. As a result of the election, the Jersey Alliance party lost 8 seats, with only a single seat representing the party in the States Assembly, until their sole member resigned from the Party several weeks later.

References

External links 

 

Living people
1949 births
Councilmen of the City of London
Knights Bachelor